The Oregon Sports Hall of Fame honors Oregon athletes, teams, coaches, and others who have made a significant contribution to sports in Oregon. The first class was inducted in 1980, with new inductees added in the fall. Operated by the Oregon Sports Trust, the museum is currently closed in preparation for moving to another facility.

History and organization
The Oregon Sports Hall of Fame inducted its first class of 54 members in 1980, a diverse group that included Olympians Mack Robinson, Don Schollander and Frank Troeh, Boston Red Sox legend Johnny Pesky, NFL hero Norm van Brocklin, Heisman Trophy winner Terry Baker, high jump innovator Dick Fosbury, and basketball coaching legend Slats Gill.

New members are inducted each fall, in a ceremony held in recent years at the Multnomah Athletic Club in Portland, Oregon.

Scholarships
As part of its educational mission to promote the values and rewards of participation in sports, the Oregon Sports Hall of Fame grants as many as nine $2,000 scholarships given to outstanding Oregon student athletes who will be attending Oregon colleges. Scholarship winners are honored during the Hall of Fame induction ceremony.

Facility
From 1986 to 1997, the museum was located in a  basement under the Standard Insurance Center in downtown Portland, Oregon. In 1997, the museum moved to a nearby facility featuring  of space with hands-on exhibits, videos, and memorabilia, such as Terry Baker's Heisman trophy (the first Heisman given to a West Coast athlete), Mack Robinson's Olympic jersey, one of Dale Murphy's Golden Gloves, and Bill Walton's jersey from the 1977 Portland Trail Blazers NBA championship game.

In mid-2008, StanCorp evicted the museum in order to expand their own office space. The museum is closed in preparation for moving to an as-yet determined location.

Inductees
The current members of the Oregon Sports Hall of Fame are listed below.

Individuals

Teams
The Hall of Fame has also inducted these teams:
 1917 University of Oregon Rose Bowl champions
 1938–39 Oregon "Tall Firs" basketball team
 1942 Oregon State Beavers Rose Bowl champions
 1944 Lind-Pomeroy Amateur Softball Association world champions
 1948 Oregon Ducks football team
 1948–49 Oregon State Beavers basketball team
 1958 Drain Black Sox National Baseball Congress Champions
 1960–61 Portland Buckaroos
 1962 Oregon Ducks track team
 1962 Oregon State Beavers football team
 1962–63 Oregon State Beavers men's basketball team
 1964 Oregon Ducks track & field team
 1964 Erv Lind Softball Amateur Softball Association World Champions
 1965–66 Oregon State Beavers men's basketball team
 1966 Linfield Baseball NAIA Champions
 1967 Oregon State Beavers football team
 1969 Contractor's, Inc. American Legion Baseball National Champions
 1975 Portland Timbers soccer team
 1976–77 Portland Trail Blazers
 1980–81 Oregon State Beavers men's basketball team
 1982, 1984, 1986, and 2004 Linfield Football National Champions
 1994 Oregon Ducks football team
 2000 Oregon State Beavers football team 
 2002 Portland Pilots soccer team
 2006 Oregon State Beavers baseball team
 2007 Oregon State Beavers baseball team
 East Bank Saloon

References

 

Halls of fame in Oregon
State sports halls of fame in the United States
All-sports halls of fame

Sports museums in Oregon
Museums in Portland, Oregon
Awards established in 1980
1980 establishments in Oregon